16-Dehydropregnenolone acetate (16-DPA) is a chemical compound used as an intermediate or synthon in the production of many semisynthetic steroids. As 7-ACA is for cephalosporins and 6-APA is for penicillins, 16-DPA is for steroids. While it is not easy to synthesize, it is a convenient intermediate which can be made from other more available materials, and which can then be modified to produce the desired target compound.

Upstream sources 
16-DPA can be produced from a variety of steroidal sapogenins. Industrially useful sources are diosgenin in mexican yams and solasodine from certain nightshades. These two sapogenins can be used in a one-pot synthesis. Solanidine in potato greens, an alkaloid sapogenin, is also a key source material.

Downstream products 
Compounds derived from 16-DPA include:
 Corticosteroids (mainly of a C22 pregnane backbone): hydrocortisone*, betamethasone*, dexamethasone*, beclometasone*, fluticasone, and prednicarbate;
 Progestogen (mainly of a C22 pregnane backbone): pregnenolone, progesterone*, various synthetic derivatives such as medroxyprogesterone acetate* and levonorgestrel*;
 Androgens (mainly of a C19 androstane, 17-keto backbone): testosterone* and esters, various synthetic derivatives;
 Estrogens (mainly of a C18 estrane, 17-hydroxy backbone): estradiol and esters such as estradiol cypionate*, various synthetic derivatives such as ethinylestradiol*.

Those marked with a * appear on the WHO Model List of Essential Medicines, some as part of a compound medication. The list is by no means complete due to the central role of 16-DPA in steroid production.

Pharmacology 
There are no current medical uses of 16-DPA. Studies in male hamsters show that the related chemical 16-DHP acts as an farnesoid X receptor (FXR) antagonist, consequently up-regulating CYP7A1 and lowering serum cholesterol. The CSIR-CDRI holds a patent over 16-DHP for prospective lipid-lowering use.

History 
Production of substantial quantities of steroids was not achieved until the Marker degradation in the late 1930s, a synthesis route converting diosgenin into the related compound 16-dehydropregnenolone (16-DP or 16-DHP). This reaction established Mexico as a world center of steroid production. 16-DPA was produced in a variant of Marker degradation published in 1940.

The earliest PubChem patent record for 16-DPA is US2656364A of 1951, describing its conversion into 17-ketosteroids.

See also 
 Mexican barbasco trade

References 

Acetate esters
Steroids